Steven John Johnson Jr. (born July 22, 1986) is an American former professional football player who was a wide receiver in the National Football League (NFL). Johnson was drafted by the Buffalo Bills in the seventh round of the 2008 NFL Draft and has also played for the San Francisco 49ers and San Diego Chargers. He played college football at Kentucky. Despite never making the Pro Bowl, Johnson was the first Bills receiver to post back-to-back seasons with over 1,000 yards receiving, and has been considered one of the best draft steals in franchise history.

High school career
Johnson was homeschooled. He was only able to play football two years there as the public school in his area, Angelo Rodriguez High School, did not add a football program until his junior year. After his senior season, he earned All-State and first-team All-Conference honors. He also played two years of basketball and was a second-team All-Conference selection.

College career
Johnson attended Chabot College in California from 2004 to 2005 before transferring to Kentucky. In his first season with the program, he recorded 12 catches for 159 yards (13.3 avg) and 1 touchdown. Against Clemson in the Music City Bowl, Johnson had three receptions for 67 yards.

The 2007 season was a historic one for Johnson as he compiled 61 receptions for 1,052 yards (17.2 avg) and 13 touchdowns. He became the fourth player in school history to gain over 1,000 yards receiving and his thirteen touchdowns in a season rank second on the school's season-record list.

During the season, he caught three game-winning touchdowns, including one against Florida State in the Music City Bowl.

After the season, Johnson was selected to the College Football News' All-Southeastern Conference first-team.

Professional career

Pre-draft

Buffalo Bills
Johnson was drafted by the Buffalo Bills in the seventh round (224th overall) of the 2008 NFL Draft.

2008 season
His first reception came in Week 5 against the Arizona Cardinals, and went for 8 yards. In Week 15, against the New York Jets, Johnson caught his first touchdown reception, a two-yard pass from J. P. Losman. He caught his second touchdown a week later against the Denver Broncos on a three-yard pass from Trent Edwards. Johnson finished his rookie season with 10 receptions for 102 yards and 2 touchdowns.

2009 season
Battling a severe rib injury, Johnson only managed 2 catches for 10 yards in the 2009 season.

2010 season

After good off-season practices Johnson was able to win the starting receiver position before 2010 season. After losing his starting position early in the season, he regained it with a string of good performances, becoming quarterback Ryan Fitzpatrick's favorite target. In a Week 7 loss to the Baltimore Ravens, Johnson had a career-game, catching 8 passes for 158 yards and a touchdown. Two weeks later, he set a career-high in catches with 11 for 145 yards against the Chicago Bears.

During Week 3 of the 2010 season in a game against the New England Patriots at Gillette Stadium, Johnson scored a fourth-quarter touchdown. After the score, he imitated a minuteman firing a rifle and fell to the ground backward pretending to be shot. Johnson was fined $10,000 for the celebration.  In a Week 11 win over the Cincinnati Bengals, he caught 8 passes for 137 yards and a career-milestone 3 touchdowns. After his first touchdown, Johnson lifted his jersey to reveal the question "Why so serious?" written on his T-shirt. The quote, made famous by The Joker in the Batman movie sequel The Dark Knight, was directed at Bengals wide receivers Terrell Owens and Chad Ochocinco, who referred to themselves as Batman and Robin. Johnson was fined $5,000 by the league office for the celebration. After dropping what could have been a game winning pass that led to an overtime loss to the Pittsburgh Steelers in November, Johnson lamented on Twitter to God, "I PRAISE YOU 24/7!!!!!! AND IS THIS HOW YOU DO ME!!!!! YOU EXPECT ME TO LEARN FROM THIS??? HOW???!!! ILL NEVER FORGET THIS!! EVER!!! THX THO . . ." 
 
He had a breakout campaign in 2010 with 82 receptions, 1073 yards and 10 touchdowns. Following the season, Johnson was named the 2010 Vizio Top Value Performer for being the NFL player who outplayed his salary by the widest margin.

2011 season
In 2011, Johnson's numbers fell a bit, posting 76 receptions for 1,004 yards and 7 touchdown receptions. According to Steve, he played the year with a torn groin and a broken hand.

During the 2011 season, Johnson was fined twice for excessive celebrations. The first was Week 12 against the New York Jets. Johnson pretended to shoot his leg and then fly like a Jet and pretended to crash, mocking Jets receiver Plaxico Burress. The second was during Week 17 against the New England Patriots, after scoring a touchdown, he lifted his jersey to reveal "Happy New Year!" written on his under-shirt. He was given a 15-yard unsportsmanlike penalty, and head coach Chan Gailey subsequently benched Johnson for the rest of the game, ending his season.

2012 season
On March 5, 2012, Johnson signed a new 5-year contract with the Buffalo Bills worth $36.25 million with a signing bonus of $8.5 million.

In the 2012 season, staying consistent with his statistics, he recorded 79 receptions for 1,046 yards and 6 touchdowns. He became the only receiver in Buffalo Bills history to record three consecutive 1,000 yard receiving seasons.

2013 season
After the release of Ryan Fitzpatrick prior to the season, Johnson worked with new Bills quarterback EJ Manuel. He caught the game-winning touchdown from Manuel in the closing seconds of a week 2 matchup against the Carolina Panthers. Johnson failed to record a fourth consecutive 1,000-yard season, finishing with 52 receptions for 597 receiving yards and 3 touchdowns.

San Francisco 49ers
On May 9, 2014, after the Buffalo Bills acquired Sammy Watkins in the 2014 NFL Draft, the Bills traded Johnson to his hometown team San Francisco 49ers for a conditional fourth round pick in 2015 Draft that could become a third round selection.

In the 2014 season Johnson posted the lowest numbers since his sophomore season, totaling 35 receptions for 435 yards and 3 touchdowns. On March 15, 2015, Johnson was released by the 49ers.

San Diego Chargers
On March 17, 2015, Johnson signed a three-year, $12 million contract with the San Diego Chargers. Johnson had a fast start to 2015, but was hampered by recurring injuries later through the season. He finished the season with 45 receptions for 497 yards and 3 touchdowns.

On August 10, 2016, it was reported that Johnson would be out for the entirety of the 2016 season after having surgery to repair his meniscus.

On March 7, 2017, Johnson was released by the Chargers.

Career statistics

References:

Playing style
During his prime, Johnson was known for his unorthodox route-running skills and footwork, which he attributes to playing basketball. Johnson used his shiftiness to confuse defensive backs and get open, making up for his average size and speed.

Personal life
Johnson is the cousin of bay-area rapper Ya Boy and Kawhi Leonard, forward for the Los Angeles Clippers of the National Basketball Association (NBA).

In 2014, he showed off his multiple tattoos for PETA's "Ink not Mink" anti-fur campaign.

Since retiring from the NFL, Johnson has taken a head coaching job for his former high school football team.

References

External links

ESPN bio

1986 births
Living people
People from Fairfield, California
Players of American football from San Francisco
African-American players of American football
American football wide receivers
Kentucky Wildcats football players
Buffalo Bills players
San Francisco 49ers players
San Diego Chargers players
Los Angeles Chargers players
Chabot Gladiators football players
21st-century African-American sportspeople
20th-century African-American people